Til Death Do Us Part is a 2005 Philippine television drama series on ABS-CBN starring Kristine Hermosa and her former husband Diether Ocampo. It aired from January 31 to May 13, 2005, with a total of 73 episodes. It was replaced by Ikaw ang Lahat sa Akin on its timeslot as Diether joins another cast.

It was part of ABS-CBN's "Iba Magmahal ang Kapamilya" campaign, which introduced 30 new programs during the first quarter of 2005.

After the success of Sana'y Wala Nang Wakas, which has ended on July 9, 2004 (6 months later), this was Ocampo's second primetime drama series with Hermosa.

Plot
An unplanned encounter of two hearts turned into a love that can last a lifetime. Be ready for a mix of tears, laughter and unruly characters as we find out how real love finds its way to where it truly belongs.

Make-up artist Ysabel is a runaway bride to a doctor, Drew. While in the process of recovering, Ysabel bumps into a hunk embalmer Manuel.

At first sight they admired each other's hearts. Both coming from a break-up, Ysabel and Manuel found their way to an exciting courtship. But, as Manuel ex-girlfriend, Roxanne, starts making a mess of Ysabel's life, suddenly she finds herself at the center of a very odd love triangle with the dependable Drew on the one side and her great love Manuel on the other.

Cast and characters
 Kristine Hermosa as Ysabel
 Diether Ocampo as Manuel
 Dominic Ochoa as Drew
 Asia Agcaoili as Roxanne
 Shaina Magdayao as Darling
 John Lapus as Dash
 Nova Villa as Conching
 Berting Labra
 Anita Linda as Lola / La (Ysabel's grandmother)
 Reggie Curley
 Bonggoy Manahan
 Tessie Villarama

See also
List of programs broadcast by ABS-CBN

References

ABS-CBN drama series
2005 Philippine television series debuts
2005 Philippine television series endings
Filipino-language television shows
Television shows set in the Philippines